Campo de Calatrava is a comarca in Castilla-La Mancha, Spain.  It takes its name from the Order of Calatrava, a military order which held territory in the area from the time when it was on the border between Christian and Muslim Spain.

A Denominación de Origen for olive oil takes its name from the comarca.  There are olive groves in sixteen of the municipios, mainly containing a cultivar called cornicabra.
Saffron is another crop cultivated in the area.

The Campo de Calatrava is a natural and historical region of La Mancha (Mancha Baja), west of Castilla-La Mancha (Spain), on the center of the province of Ciudad Real.

Geomorphologically it is a region characterized by its hills of volcanic origin, and its lagoons.

The history of this region is related to that of the Order of Calatrava that had its headquarters in Almagro and its fortress was the Castle of Calatrava la Nueva. Its origin is placed in one of the most warlike and decisive stages of the Late Middle Ages for the unity of Castile, linked to the founding of the aforementioned Military Order of the same name, whose task was the vigilance and protection of the South-South-West vanguard of the Plateau of the Islamic raids, as the first contention front of Castile and Toledo, its main capital, beyond the depression of the Tagus, next to the banks of the Guadiana.

See also
 Campo de Calatrava Volcanic Field

References

External links

Comarcas of Castilla–La Mancha